The following outline is provided as an overview of and topical guide to the broad, interdisciplinary subject of globalization:

Globalization (or globalisation) – processes of international integration arising from the interchange of world views, products, ideas, and other aspects of culture. Advances in transportation and telecommunications infrastructure, including the rise of the Internet, are major factors in globalization, generating further interdependence of economic and cultural activities. Globalizing processes affect and are affected by business and work organization, economics, sociocultural resources, and the natural environment.

Global studies

Global studies – interdisciplinary and multidisciplinary academic study of globalizing forces and trends. Global studies may include the investigation of one or more aspects of globalization, but tend to concentrate on how globalizing trends are redefining the relationships between states, organizations, societies, communities, and individuals, creating new challenges that cannot be solved by nations or markets alone. Study of the factors contributing to globalization may originate in many academic concentrations, such as political science, economics, and sociology.

History

History of globalization – generally broken-down into three periods: Archaic, Proto-globalization, and Modern.

 The Archaic period is defined as events and developments from the time of the earliest civilizations until roughly 1600.
 The period of Proto-globalization roughly spans the years between 1600 and 1800. It was largely shaped in this era by the operations of colonialism.
 The Modern period of globalization covers from the 19th century until the present time. Imperialism and industrialization have figured largely in shaping modern globalizing forces and trends.

Globalization concepts

Links below are to articles, unless otherwise specified.

Globalization-related theories

Since globalization is not an independent phenomenon but is highly interrelated with world views, products, ideas, and other aspects of culture, explanations of why globalization occurs and what the effects of globalization are or can be expected are related to theories ranging from economic development to revolutionary socialism.

  Coupled human–environment systems
  Capitalism-related
  Dependency theory
  Ecological modernization
  Economic development
  Economic nationalism
  Engaged theory
  Industrialisation
  Mercantilism
  Modernization
  Modernization theory
  New international division of labour
  Post-contemporary society
  Post-industrial society
  Postmodernism
  Primitive accumulation of capital
  Regulation theory
  Revolutionary socialism
  Sociocultural evolution
  World-systems theory

Globalization-related indices

 List of globalization-related indices
 Corruption Perceptions Index
 Democracy Index
  (category)
 Freedom in the World
 Global city
 Globalization Index

Aspects of globalization

Global business organization

International business development and the organization of business and trade worldwide are fundamental aspects of globalization and the development of globalizing systems.

  Global business organization (category)
 Corporate citizenship
 Global sourcing
 Cross-border leasing
 Global strategy
 Global R&D management
 Intermodal freight transport
 Low-cost country sourcing
 Outsourcing
 Supply chain management
 Global supply-chain finance
 Industrial ecology
 International business
 Standardization
 International standards
 International Organization for Standardization (ISO)
 International trade
 Free trade zones
 Special Economic Zones
 Multinational companies

Economic globalization

Economic globalization

Economic globalization – increasing economic interdependence of national economies across the world through a rapid increase in cross-border movement of goods, services, technology, and capital. International economic activities and institutions that influence or characterize economic globalization include:

 Economic globalization (category)
 Free markets
 International economics
 Development economics
 Economic integration
 International finance
 Global financial system
 International monetary systems
 World currency
 North–South divide
 Social economy
 Trade globalization
 World economy
  (category)

Sociocultural globalization
All aspects of globalization are essentially sociocultural in nature. Here, aspects of the globalization of culture are detailed, including cultural diversity, cultural homogenization and its backlash, as well as multiculturalism, multilingualism, global civics, world governance and other political developments and social movements related to globalization.

 Anti-globalization
 Criticisms of globalization
 Cultural globalization
 Cultural appropriation
 Cultural diversity
 Cultural homogenization
 Interculturalism
 Multiculturalism
Time–space compression
 Democratization of technology
 Economic liberalism
 Endangered languages
 Global civics
 Global elite
 Global digital divide
 Global health
 Global inequality (category)
 International inequality
 Global politics
 Global justice
 International law
 International human rights law
 World democracy
 World government
 Consumer movement
 Occupy movement
 Supranational union
 Transnationalism
 Global village
 Globalism
 International development
 International education
 International organization
 Internet
 World Wide Web
 Multilingualism
 Pizza effect
 Race to the bottom
 Social web
 Transformation of culture
 Transnational cinema
 Transnational organized crime
 Universal Declaration of Human Rights
 Westernization
 World Englishes
 World Music Awards
 World population
 World Values Survey

Workforce globalization

Along with the globalization of business comes a new spatial division of labor, which occurs when production processes are no longer confined to national economies and labor becomes sourced from different parts of the globe. This global workforce has implications ranging from immigration policy to basic human and labor rights.

  Workforce globalization (category)
 New international division of labour
 Brain drain
 Reverse brain drain
 Contingent workforce
 Human migration
 Expatriate
 Foreign born
 Immigration policy
 Illegal immigration
 Migrant worker
 Visas
 International labor standards
 Global labor arbitrage
 Global Labour University
 Global Proficiency Certificate
 Optional Practical Training
 Global workforce
 Labor rights
 Offshoring
 Precarious work
 Visa policy by country (category)

Global natural environment

The natural environment can be contrasted with the built environment, comprising the areas and components that are strongly influenced by humans. In the age of globalization, few absolutely natural environments remain. Human challenges to the natural environment, such as climate change, cross-boundary water and air pollution, over-fishing of the ocean, and the spread of invasive species require at least transnational and, often, global solutions.

 Global natural environment (category)
 Environmental treaties (category)
 Biological globalization (category)
 Natural environment
 Global biodiversity
 Invasive species
 Columbian Exchange
 Climate change
 Global dimming
 Global warming
 Ozone depletion
 Planetary boundaries
 World ocean
 Earth system science
 Ecological economics
 Ecological imperialism
 Environmental social science
 Human ecology
 Global change
 Global commons
 Globalization and disease
 Sustainability
 Water scarcity
 World energy consumption
 World Environment Day

Globalization issues

Processes of globalization present humankind with many issues that are considered problematic in at least one culture or society, and often multiple societies.

  Global issues (category)
 Climate justice
 Economic inequality
 Fair trade
 Forced migration
 Global dimming
 Human overpopulation
 Human trafficking
 Illicit financial flows
 Invasive species
 Investor-state dispute settlement
 Global digital divide
 Global justice
 Migrant sex work
 North–South divide
 Ozone depletion
 Peace
 Race to the bottom
 Transnational organized crime
 Water issues in developing countries
 Water scarcity
 World hunger and malnutrition
 Westernization

By location

  Globalization by location (category)
 Globalisation in India
 Economic liberalisation in India
 Globalization in China
 Globalization and women in China
 Middle East and globalization

Categories about globalization-related organizations

   (category)
  (category)
  (category)
 
 
  (category)
  (category)
  (category)

Globalization-related lists

 Lists of environmental topics (category)
 Lists of political parties by United Nations geoscheme (category)
 2009 flu pandemic by country
 International athletics championships and games
 List of demonstrations against corporate globalization
 List of epidemics
 List of free trade agreements
 List of global sustainability statistics
 List of globalization-related indices
 List of globalization-related journals
 List of human rights articles by country
 List of human rights organisations
 List of intergovernmental organizations
 List of international rankings
 List of Occupy movement protest locations
 Lists of ecoregions by country
 Lists of endangered languages
 The Superclass List
 World economy – various embedded lists and indicators

Works about globalization

  Works about globalization (category)
 Books about globalization (category)
 Documentary films about globalization (category)
 Serials about globalization (category)
 List of globalization-related journals

Persons influential in globalization

 Writers about globalization (category)
 :Category:Anti-globalization writers
 :Category:World system scholars

See also

 Civilizing mission
 Columbian Exchange
 Development criticism
 Global civics
 Great Transition
 Interdependence
 Jet Age
 Lisbon Strategy
 Military globalization
 Technocapitalism
 Transnational cinema
 Transnational citizenship
 Triadization
 Vermeer's Hat
 United Nations Millennium Declaration
 Washington Consensus

References

Notes

Further reading

 
 
 Carpenter, John. "Puritan Missions as Globalization," Fides et Historia. 31:2, 1999 pp. 103–123.

 
 
 
  With contributions by Samir Amin, Christopher Chase-Dunn, Andre Gunder Frank, Immanuel Wallerstein. Pre-publication download of Chapter 5: The European Union: global challenge or global governance? 14 world system hypotheses and two scenarios on the future of the Union, pages 93 – 196 Arno Tausch at http://edoc.vifapol.de/opus/volltexte/2012/3587/pdf/049.pdf.

External links

Comprehensive discussion of the term at the Site Global Transformations 
 Globalization Website (Emory University) Links, Debates, Glossary etc.
 BBC News Special Report – "Globalisation"
 "Resilience, Panarchy, and World-Systems Analysis", from the Ecology and Society Journal
 "Globalization" Stanford Encyclopedia of Philosophy Analysis of the idea and its history.
 OECD Globalization statistics
 YaleGlobal Online
 Global 3000 Globalization Program by Deutsche Welle-TV

Globalization
Globalization
Sociology lists
Globalization-related lists